The following lists events that happened during 2006 in the Grand Duchy of Luxembourg.

Incumbents

Events

January – March
 1 January – The communes of Bastendorf and Fouhren merge to form the new commune of Tandel.
 1 January – The communes of Kautenbach and Wilwerwiltz merge to form the new commune of Kiischpelt.
 16 January – Arcelor makes Dofasco a takeover offer of C$71 per share
 24 January – The board of Dofasco accepts Arcelor's takeover offer.
 27 January – Mittal Steel unveils a bid for a takeover of Arcelor, at a price of €28.21 per share
 27 January – Denis Robert is charged by a Luxembourg City magistrate for defamation and slander.
 29 January – Arcelor's board of directors unanimously rejects Mittal's hostile takeover.
 31 January – Jean-Claude Juncker announces his government's opposition to Mittal's bid for Arcelor.
 20 February – Arcelor takes majority ownership of Dofasco.

April – June
 2 April – The Action Committee for Democracy and Pensions Justice changes its name to 'Alternative Democratic Reform Party'.
 7 April – Agnès Durdu is appointed to the Council of State, replacing Carlo Meintz, who resigned the previous May.
 20 April – SES Astra launches its Astra 1KR satellite.
 2 May – Jean-Claude Juncker delivers his twelfth State of the Nation address.
 3 May – The European Under-17 Football Championship kicks off at Stade John Grün, in Mondorf-les-Bains.  As hosts, Luxembourg qualifies automatically.
 14 May – Russia defeats the Czech Republic 5–3 on penalties to win the European Under-17 Football Championship at Stade Josy Barthel, in Luxembourg City.
 20 May – F91 Dudelange win the Luxembourg Cup, beating Jeunesse Esch 3–2 in the final.
 25 May – Jean-Claude Juncker is awarded the Karlspreis for his dedication to the European Constitution.
 26 May – Arcelor and Severstal sign a merger agreement, as Arcelor attempts to deter Mittal Steel's takeover bid.
 28 May – The 2005–06 season of the  National Division finishes, with F91 Dudelange winning the title to complete the Double.
 10 June – Hereditary Grand Duke Guillaume is appointed to the Council of State.
 21 June – Severstal substantially improves its merger offer to Arcelor in face of improved terms offered by Mittal.
 25 June – The board of Arcelor agrees to a merger with Mittal Steel to form Arcelor-Mittal.  The final offer values each Arcelor share at €40.40.
 30 June – Arcelor shareholders reject the merger with Severstal at an Extraordinary General Meeting.

July – September
 1 July – Mudam is opened in Luxembourg City.
 31 July – Luxembourg ratifies the Treaty of Accession for the accession of Bulgaria and Romania to the European Union.
 1 August – Georges Wivenes is appointed to the Council of State, replacing Charles Ruppert, who resigned in January.
 5 August – The 2006–07 season of the National Division kicks off.
 29 September – Prince Louis marries Tessy Antony in Gilsdorf.  Upon the marriage, Louis renounces all succession rights for himself and his descendants.  Antony takes up the Grand Ducal Family's surname  'de Nassau' , but does not become a princess.

October – December
 1 October – Ukrainian Alyona Bondarenko wins the singles tournament of the Fortis Championships Luxembourg, beating Francesca Schiavone 6-3 6–2 in the final.  Schiavone wins the doubles tournament along with Květa Peschke.
 11 October – A train crash on the Franco-Luxembourgian border kills 6 people and injuries a further 20.
 15 October – Lucien Lux admits that the Chemins de Fer Luxembourgeois was responsible for the Zoufftgen train crash of 11 October.
 24 November – Luxembourg ratifies the International Convention against Doping in Sport.
 9 December – Luxembourg City's year as European Capital of Culture for 2007 is officially launched.
 14 December – SES Global is renamed to 'SES'.
 1 August – Marc Schaefer is appointed to the Council of State, replacing Jean-Pierre Sinner, who resigned in October.
 20 December – Arcelor-Mittal agrees to buy Mexican steel-maker Sicartsa from Grupo Villacero for $1.4bn.

Deaths
 20 March – Nicolas Birtz, footballer and politician
 31 August – Edy Hein, cyclist

Footnotes

 
Years of the 21st century in Luxembourg
Luxembourg
Luxembourg